Shiv Charan is a 1982 Bollywood film  Directed by K. Anil Kumar starring Navin Nischol, Vinod Mehra, Zarina Wahab, Prema Narayan in lead roles.

Cast

Soundtrack 
The soundtrack was composed by Bappi Lahiri and written by Amit Khanna. 
"Yeh Husn Yeh Shabab" – Chandrani Mukherjee, Anwar Hussain
"Bijli Mai Hu Bijli" – Chandrani Mukherjee
"Dil Mujhse Kahe Mai Tumse Ke" – Bappi Lahiri, Annette Pinto
"Koi Kab Talak Yahan Yun Hi" – Mahendra Kapoor, Kishore Kumar
"Meri Hai Jawani" – Asha Bhosle

References

External links 
 

Films scored by Bappi Lahiri
1982 films
1980s Hindi-language films